Italy  competed at the 2019 World Aquatics Championships in Gwangju, South Korea from 12 to 28 July.

Medalists

Artistic swimming

Italy's artistic swimming team consisted of 14 athletes (1 male and 13 female).

Women

Mixed

 Legend: (R) = Reserve Athlete

Diving

Italy's diving team consisted of 7 athletes (4 male, 3 female).

Men

Women

Mixed

High diving

Italy qualified one male high diver.

Open water swimming

Italy qualified six male and four female open water swimmers.

Men

Women

Mixed

Swimming 

Italy has entered 33 swimmers.

Men

Women

Mixed

 Legend: (*) = Swimmers who participated in the heat only.

Water polo

Men's tournament

Team roster

Marco del Lungo
Francesco di Fulvio
Stefano Luongo
Pietro Figlioli (C)
Edoardo di Somma
Alessandro Velotto
Vincenzo Renzuto Iodice
Gonzalo Echenique
Niccolo Figari
Michaël Bodegas
Matteo Aicardi
Vincenzo Dolce
Gianmarco Nicosia
Coach: Alessandro Campagna

Group D

Quarterfinals

Semifinals

Final

Women's tournament

Team roster

Giulia Gorlero
Chiara Tabani
Arianna Garibotti
Silvia Avegno
Elisa Queirolo (C)
Rosaria Aiello
Domitilla Picozzi
Roberta Bianconi
Giulia Emmolo
Valeria Palmieri
Izabella Chiappini
Giulia Viacava
Federica Lavi
Coach: Fabio Conti

Group D

Quarterfinals

5th–8th place semifinals

Fifth place game

References

World Aquatics Championships
2019
Nations at the 2019 World Aquatics Championships